Kumar Mangat Pathak, who works exclusively as actor Ajay Devgn's manager, is an Indian film producer, film distributor, studio executive and the founder of Panorama Studios.

Filmography

References

Year of birth missing (living people)
Living people
Indian film producers